The Coastal Virginia Offshore Wind (CVOW) is an offshore wind energy project located  about 43 km (27 mi) off the coast of Virginia Beach, Virginia, U.S. The initial phase, a two-turbine, 12-MW pilot project constructed in 2020, is the second utility scale offshore wind farm operating in the United States (after Block Island Wind Farm). Dominion Energy and Ørsted US Offshore Wind collaborated on the project, which is estimated to have cost $300 million and is expected to generate enough electricity to power up to 3,000 homes. It is the first utility scale wind farm serving Virginia and the first built in U.S. federal waters, in a wind lease area that covers about 2,135 acres (3.3 sq mi).

Pilot project
The Virginia Offshore Wind Technology Advancement Project (VOWTAP) was a program to explore offshore wind farms in the Atlantic Ocean off the coast of Virginia. Dominion Virginia Power was awarded $4 million in 2012 and $47 million in 2014 from the United States Department of Energy (DOE) to help fund the construction of a 12-megawatt demonstration project, consisting of two 6-megawatt offshore wind turbines. It intended to have them in full operation in 2017, but the project was withdrawn from the DOE project since the single bid for construction was too high and other funding requirements were not met. Some exploratory boring off the coast had taken place.

The eventual pilot project was built by Ørsted US Offshore Wind for Dominion Energy to explore potential for expansion of a wind farm off the coast with a potential of up to 2,000MW. Construction began in May 2020. Bluewater Wind handled port logistics for the project. Power from the turbines, built by Siemens Gamesa, is cabled to a substation near Camp Pendleton. Seaway 7 supplied, installed, buried and tested the offshore power cables.

Proposed project

See also

Wind power in the United States
List of offshore wind farms in the United States
List of offshore wind farms
Energy Policy Act of 2005

References

External links 
Coastal Virginia Offshore Wind
Video
Orsted
Offshore Wind Magazine

Offshore wind farms in the United States
Proposed wind farms in the United States
Wind power in Virginia
Dominion Energy
2020 establishments in Virginia